Renaud de Pons may refer to:

Renaud I de Pons (fl. 1070s)
Renaud de Pons, Seneschal of Gascony (d. aft. 1228)
Renaud II de Pons (d. 1252)
Renaud III de Pons (d. 1272)
Renaud IV de Pons (d. aft. 1308)
Hélie-Rudel II de Pons, also called Renaud (d. 1334)
Renaud IV de Pons, Viscount of Carlat (d. 1356)
Renaud V de Pons (d. 1356)
Renaud VI de Pons (d. 1427)
Renaud VII de Pons (d. 1396)

See also
Rainaut de Pons, troubadour